NGC 3821 is a low surface brightness spiral galaxy and a ring galaxy about 270 million light-years away in the constellation Leo. The galaxy was discovered by astronomer William Herschel on April 26, 1785 and is a member of the Leo Cluster.

See also
 List of NGC objects (3001–4000)
 NGC 2859
 NGC 3081
 Malin 1

References

External links

3821
36314
6663
Leo (constellation)
Leo Cluster
Intermediate spiral galaxies
Astronomical objects discovered in 1785
Ring galaxies
Low surface brightness galaxies